Boronia humifusa is a plant in the citrus family, Rutaceae and is endemic to the south-west of Western Australia. It is a low-growing, mostly hairless, wiry perennial with four-angled branches, simple, flat leaves and pink or red, four-petalled flowers in groups on the ends of the branches.

Description
The eight stamens are hairy and similar to each other. Flowering occurs in June or September.

Taxonomy and naming
Boronia humifusa was first formally described in 1998 by Paul G. Wilson and the description was published in Nuytsia from a specimen collected near the Capel to Donnybrook road. The specific epithet (humifusa) is a Latin word meaning "spread-out over the ground", referring to the habit of this boronia.

Distribution and habitat
This boronia grows is only known from the area between Busselton and Donnybrook where it grows in open forest.

Conservation
Boronia humifusa is classified as "Priority One" by the Government of Western Australia Department of Parks and Wildlife meaning that it is known from only one or a few locations which are potentially at risk.

References

humifusa
Flora of Western Australia
Plants described in 1998
Taxa named by Paul G. Wilson